Bettlach may refer to:
Bettlach, Switzerland
Bettlach, Haut-Rhin, in Alsace, France